Qasabeh is an alternate name of Fereydunkenar, a city in Mazandaran Province, Iran.

Qasabeh may also refer to:
 Qasabeh, Kerman
 Qasabeh, Abadan, Khuzestan Province
 Qasabeh, Khorramshahr, Khuzestan Province
 Qasabeh, Shadegan, Khuzestan Province
 Qasabeh, South Khorasan
 Qasabeh-ye Firuz Kuh
 Qasabeh-ye Rud
 Qasabeh-ye Gharbi Rural District, in Razavi Khorasan Province
 Qasabeh-ye Sharqi Rural District, in Razavi Khorasan Province